SS Ben Jee was a steel-built coastal cargo vessel which was operated out of Ramsey, Isle of Man for the Ramsey Steamship Company;  ostensibly to Garston, Belfast and Whitehaven. Her name, Ben Jee, came from the Manx Gaelic term for Goddess. Ben Jee was constructed in Rotterdam (circa) 1920. Originally named the Jolly Basil she was registered in London until acquired by the Ramsey Steam Ship Company in the Spring of 1924.

Service life 
Ben Jee entered service with the Ramsey Steam Ship Company under her original name in November 1924 under the command of Captain John Corlett. Capt. Corlett's previous command had been that of the Ben Blanche. Ben Jee was considered a well suited vessel for the company's operation, said to be well appointed throughout. She possessed two large hatchways which enabled an efficient loading and unloading operation.

Incidents
On Tuesday 14 April 1925, a crew member of the Ben Jee drowned in Youghal Harbour, County Cork. William Quirk was the Second Engineer on the vessel, and was going ashore in a small rowing boat with a fellow crew member, Harold Dawson, in order to post some letters. Quirk fell over the side and although Dawson tried to save him, he sank quickly. The body of William Quirk was recovered and returned to the Isle of Man.

Disposal
The Ben Jee was sold in 1933. She saw further service  as a molasses tanker with a number of companies under the names Athelrill and Molarill before being scrapped in 1959 at Georgetown, Guyana. In 1946 the Ramsey Steam Ship Company acquired another vessel which they subsequently named Ben Jee.

References

Merchant ships of the Isle of Man
1919 ships
Ferries of the Isle of Man
Merchant ships of the United Kingdom